A Boy Named Sue is a 2001 documentary film directed by Julie Wyman. It shows the life and transition of Theo, a transgender man who undergoes various stages of transition (including a mastectomy and hormone therapy). The protagonist is filmed extensively throughout, gives a number of interviews, and eventually settles down as a gay male. The film's title is taken from the song A Boy Named Sue.

Distribution and reception
The film played at several festivals including the 2000 San Francisco International Lesbian and Gay Film Festival and Reel Affirmations. It was nominated for a 2004 GLAAD Media Award.

References

External links

 

2001 documentary films
2001 films
2001 LGBT-related films
American documentary films
American LGBT-related films
Transgender-related documentary films
Films about trans men
2000s English-language films
2000s American films